In enzymology, a myosin-heavy-chain kinase is an enzyme that catalyzes the chemical reaction

ATP + [myosin heavy-chain]  ADP + [myosin heavy-chain] phosphate

Thus, the two substrates of this enzyme are ATP and myosin heavy-chain, whereas its two products are ADP and myosin heavy-chain phosphate.

This enzyme belongs to the family of transferases, specifically those transferring a phosphate group to the sidechain oxygen atom of serine or threonine residues in proteins (protein-serine/threonine kinases). The systematic name of this enzyme class is ATP:[myosin heavy-chain] O-phosphotransferase. Other names in common use include
ATP:myosin-heavy-chain O-phosphotransferase
calmodulin-dependent myosin heavy chain kinase
MHCK
MIHC kinase
myosin heavy chain kinase
myosin I heavy-chain kinase
myosin II heavy-chain kinase
[myosin-heavy-chain] kinase
myosin heavy chain kinase A
STK6.

References

 
 
 
 
 
 
 
 
 

EC 2.7.11
Enzymes of unknown structure